Acyl-CoA synthetase long-chain family member 6 is an enzyme that in humans is encoded by the ACSL6 gene. Long-chain acyl-CoA synthetases such as ACSL6, catalyze the formation of acyl-CoA from fatty acids, ATP, and CoA.

Structure
The ACSL6 gene is located on the 5th chromosome, with its specific location being 5q31.1. The gene contains 23 exons. ACSL6 encodes a 77.7 kDa protein that is composed of 697 amino acids; 10 peptides have been observed through mass spectrometry data.

References

External links

Further reading

Human proteins